This is a list of the main career statistics of professional Australian tennis player, Bernard Tomic. All statistics are according to the ATP Tour. To date, Tomic has reached one Grand Slam quarterfinal at the 2011 Wimbledon Championships and won four ATP singles titles including two consecutive titles at the Claro Open Colombia from 2014–2015. He was also a quarterfinalist at the 2015 BNP Paribas Open, the 2015 Shanghai Rolex Masters, the 2016 Western & Southern Open – Men's singles and part of the team which reached the semifinals of the 2015 Davis Cup. He also reached the fourth round of the Australian Open in 2012, 2015 and 2016. Tomic achieved a career high singles ranking of world No. 17 on 11 January 2016.

Performance timelines

Singles
Current through the 2022 ATP Tour.

Notes
2014 US Open counts as 1 win, 0 losses. David Ferrer received a walkover in the second round, after Tomic withdrew.
2015 Indian Wells Masters counts as 3 wins, 0 losses. Novak Djokovic received a walkover in the quarterfinals after Tomic withdrew with a back injury.

Doubles

ATP career finals

Singles: 6 (4 titles, 2 runner-ups)

Doubles: 1 (1 runner-up)

ATP Challengers and ITF Futures finals

Singles: 11 (6 titles, 5 runner-ups)

Exhibition tournament finals

Junior Grand Slam finals

Singles: 2 (2 titles)

Doubles: 1 (1 runner-up)

 Record against top 10 players 

Tomic's match record against players who have been ranked in the top 10.  Only ATP Tour main draw and Davis Cup matches are considered. Players who have been ranked No. 1 are in boldface.

 Fernando Verdasco 6–1
 Kevin Anderson 4–1
 Tommy Haas 3–1
 David Goffin 2–1
 Fabio Fognini 2–2
 Kei Nishikori 2–3
 David Ferrer 2–4
 Richard Gasquet 2–8
 Felix Auger-Aliassime 1–0
 James Blake 1–0
 Nikolay Davydenko 1–0
 Ernests Gulbis 1–0
 Hubert Hurkacz 1–0
 Lleyton Hewitt 1–0
 Robin Söderling 1–0
 Stanislas Wawrinka 1–1
 Roberto Bautista Agut 1–2
 Mardy Fish 1–2
 Jack Sock 1–2
 Marin Čilić 1–3
 Radek Štěpánek 1–3
 Marcos Baghdatis 0–1
 Taylor Fritz 0–1
 Juan Mónaco 0–1
 Lucas Pouille 0–1
 Andy Roddick 0–1
 Denis Shapovalov 0–1
 Janko Tipsarević 0–1
 Pablo Carreño Busta 0–2
 Juan Martín del Potro 0–2
 Grigor Dimitrov 0–2
 Gaël Monfils 0–2
 Dominic Thiem 0–2
 Mikhail Youzhny 0–2
 John Isner 0–3
 Rafael Nadal 0–3
 Diego Schwartzman 0–3
 Gilles Simon 0–3
 Jo-Wilfried Tsonga 0–3
 Roger Federer 0–4
 Tomáš Berdych 0–5
 Andy Murray 0–5
 Milos Raonic 0–5
 Novak Djokovic 0–6* .''

Top-10 wins per season
Tomic has an 8–40 (.167) record against players who were, at the time the match was played, ranked in the top 10.

National representation

Davis Cup (17–4)

References 

Tomic, Bernard